Richard J. Herring is an American economist, currently the Jacob Safra Professor of International Banking at Wharton School of the University of Pennsylvania.

Bibliography

References

Year of birth missing (living people)
Living people
University of Pennsylvania faculty
American economists